Ilia Jarostchuk (born August 1, 1964) is a former American football linebacker who played for the St. Louis Cardinals, San Francisco 49ers, Miami Dolphins, Phoenix Cardinals, and New England Patriots. He played college football at New Hampshire.

Early life 
Jarostchuk was born on August 1, 1964, in Utica, New York. His parents had moved from the Soviet Union to the United States in 1958. He has three younger siblings: brothers Alex and Basil, and sister Anya.

High school years 
Jarostchuk played high school football at Whitesboro Central High School, although he did not join the team until his senior year, only playing soccer before that.

College years 
Jarostchuk attended the University of New Hampshire, where he double majored in business administration and civil engineering. Together with his younger brothers Alex and Basil, he formed part of "The Russian Front" on the Wildcats' defensive line. His younger sister, Anya, also attended the school for one year.

During his college career, Jarostchuk made 204 tackles and 21 sacks, earning AP Division I-AA All-American honors in his junior year and making All-East Coast Athletic Conference during his senior year.

NFL career

St. Louis Cardinals 
The St. Louis Cardinals selected Jarostchuk in the fifth round of the 1987 NFL Draft, with the 127th pick overall. He played 12 games with the Cardinals during the 1987 season, mainly appearing on special teams. The Cardinals released him on August 30, 1988.

San Francisco 49ers (first stint) 
Jarostchuk signed for one game with the San Francisco 49ers in 1988. The 49ers released him on September 16, 1988.

Miami Dolphins 
In 1988, Jarostchuk joined the Miami Dolphins, playing six games with the team that season. The Dolphins waived Jarostchuk on November 9, 1988, and released him the following day.

Phoenix Cardinals 
As a free agent, Jarostchuk re-signed with the Cardinals, who had since relocated to Phoenix, Arizona. He played in all 16 games of the Cardinals' 1989 season, with one start at middle linebacker. That start was the team's November 26 game against the Tampa Bay Buccaneers, which the Cardinals barely lost, with a score of 14–13.

New England Patriots 
On March 24, 1990, Jarostchuk signed with the New England Patriots. He played 12 games with the team, starting one game at right linebacker. However, he mainly saw action on special teams.

The Patriots had an abysmal 1–15 record in their 1990 season, and Jarostchuk did not play in any winning games that year. He started in the team's final game of the year, a December 30 matchup against the New York Giants, which the Patriots lost 13–10. The Giants later went on to win the Super Bowl. 

Jarostchuk signed again with the Patriots as a free agent on September 27, 1991, and was released on August 20, 1992. He did not appear in any games in the 1991 season.

San Francisco 49ers (second stint) 
Just days after being released by the Patriots, Jarostchuk was signed again by the 49ers, on August 25, 1992. He was released on September 1, 1992.

References

1964 births
Living people
American football linebackers
Miami Dolphins players
New Hampshire Wildcats football players
Phoenix Cardinals players
Players of American football from New York (state)
New England Patriots players
Russian players of American football
San Francisco 49ers players
Sportspeople from Utica, New York
St. Louis Cardinals (football) players